The 2015 CAF Confederation Cup (officially the 2015 Orange CAF Confederation Cup for sponsorship reasons) was the 12th edition of the CAF Confederation Cup, Africa's secondary club football competition organized by the Confederation of African Football (CAF). The winner earned the right to play in the 2016 CAF Super Cup.

Étoile du Sahel of Tunisia won the competition for the second time in their history after a 2–1 aggregate victory over Orlando Pirates of South Africa in the final. Al-Ahly were the defending champions, and after qualifying for the 2015 CAF Champions League, they entered the 2015 CAF Confederation Cup after they lost in the Champions League second round, but they were eliminated in the semi-finals.

Association team allocation
All 56 CAF member associations may enter the CAF Confederation Cup, with the 12 highest ranked associations according to their CAF 5-Year Ranking eligible to enter two teams in the competition. The title holders can also enter if they have not qualified for the CAF Champions League. As a result, theoretically a maximum of 69 teams could enter the tournament (plus eight teams eliminated from the CAF Champions League which enter the play-off round) – although this level has never been reached.

For the 2015 CAF Confederation Cup, the CAF uses the 2009–2013 CAF 5-Year Ranking, which calculates points for each entrant association based on their clubs’ performance over those 5 years in the CAF Champions League and CAF Confederation Cup. The criteria for points are the following:

The points are multiplied by a coefficient according to the year as follows:
2013 – 5
2012 – 4
2011 – 3
2010 – 2
2009 – 1

Teams
The following 63 teams from 43 associations entered the competition.

Teams in bold received a bye to the first round. The other teams entered the preliminary round.

Associations are shown according to their 2009–2013 CAF 5-Year Ranking – those with a ranking score have their rank and score indicated.

Schedule
The schedule of the competition was as follows (all draws are held at the CAF headquarters in Cairo, Egypt).

Qualifying rounds

The draw for the preliminary, first and second qualifying rounds was held on 22 December 2014.

Qualification ties were played on a home-and-away two-legged basis. If the aggregate score was tied after the second leg, the away goals rule would be applied, and if still level, the penalty shoot-out would be used to determine the winner (no extra time would be played).

Preliminary round

First round

Notes

Second round

Play-off round
The draw for the play-off round was held on 5 May 2015. The winners of the Confederation Cup second round were drawn against the losers of the Champions League second round, with the former hosting the second leg.

Group stage

The draw for the group stage was held on 5 May 2015. The eight teams were drawn into two groups of four. Each group was played on a home-and-away round-robin basis. The winners and runners-up of each group advanced to the semi-finals.

Tiebreakers
The teams were ranked according to points (3 points for a win, 1 point for a draw, 0 points for a loss). If tied on points, tiebreakers would be applied in the following order:
Number of points obtained in games between the teams concerned;
Goal difference in games between the teams concerned;
Goals scored in games between the teams concerned;
Away goals scored in games between the teams concerned;
If, after applying criteria 1 to 4 to several teams, two teams still have an equal ranking, criteria 1 to 4 are reapplied exclusively to the matches between the two teams in question to determine their final rankings. If this procedure does not lead to a decision, criteria 6 to 9 apply;
Goal difference in all games;
Goals scored in all games;
Away goals scored in all games;
Drawing of lots.

Group A

Group B

Knockout stage

Knockout ties were played on a home-and-away two-legged basis. If the aggregate score was tied after the second leg, the away goals rule would be applied, and if still level, the penalty shoot-out would be used to determine the winner (no extra time would be played).

Bracket

Semi-finals
In the semi-finals, the group A winners played the group B runners-up, and the group B winners played the group A runners-up, with the group winners hosting the second leg.

Final

In the final, the order of legs was determined by a draw, held after the group stage draw.

Étoile du Sahel won 2–1 on aggregate.

Top scorers

See also
2015 CAF Champions League
2016 CAF Super Cup

References

External links
Orange CAF Confederation Cup 2015, CAFonline.com

 
2015
2